Super 45 is the debut EP and first release by Stereolab. It was issued on 10" vinyl and limited to approximately 800 copies.
It was sold at concerts, via mail order, and at the Rough Trade record store in London.

All four tracks were later included on Switched On.

Track listing
 "The Light That Will Cease to Fail" – 3:24
 "Au Grand Jour" – 3:41
 "Brittle" – 2:28
 "Au Grand Jour'"– 3:28

References

1991 debut EPs
Stereolab EPs